Vladyslav Volodymyrovych Nekhtiy (born 19 December 1991) is a professional footballer who plays as a midfielder who plays for Metalist Kharkiv. Born in Kazakhstan, he has represented Ukraine at youth level.

Career
He is product of FC Shakhtar Donetsk sportive school.

Nekhtiy signed 3 years contract with FC Kairat in Kazakhstan Premier League from February 2013. In June 2014, Nekhtiy had his contract with Kairat terminated. Following his release from Kairat, Nekhtiy signed for fellow Kazakhstan Premier League side FC Kaisar in the summer of 2014, leaving them a year later in June 2015.

Personal life
Along with his Ukrainian citizenship, he also possesses a Kazakh passport. Vladyslav is a son of another footballer Volodymyr Nekhtiy and is the youngest of the Volodymyr's three sons.

References

External links 
 
 

Ukrainian footballers
FC Shakhtar-3 Donetsk players
FC Kairat players
FC Kaisar players
FC Kramatorsk players
Association football midfielders
1991 births
Living people
Ukrainian expatriate footballers
Expatriate footballers in Kazakhstan
Ukrainian expatriate sportspeople in Kazakhstan
FC Mariupol players
FC Poltava players
FC Metalist Kharkiv players
Ukrainian Premier League players
Ukrainian First League players
Ukrainian Second League players
Ukraine youth international footballers